Central Ladprao (previously known as CentralPlaza Lardprao) is a shopping complex, owned by Central Pattana. The complex opened on 25 December 1982, and was the first integrated shopping complex by Central Pattana. It is on Phahonyothin Road at the end of Lat Phrao Road in Chatuchak district, Bangkok.

Anchor 
 Central Department Store
 Power Buy
 Supersports
 B2S Think Space
 Living House at Central
 Tops Food Hall (Old Tops Market)
 Tops Flavour
 BCC Hall
 SFX Cinema 10 Cinemas
 BTS Green Line Ha Yaek Lat Phrao Station
 Centara Grand at Central Lardprao

See also 
 List of shopping malls in Thailand
 List of largest shopping malls in Thailand

References

Bibliography

External links 
 Central Group website
 Sofitel Central Plaza

Shopping malls in Bangkok
Convention centers in Thailand
Central Pattana
Chatuchak district
Shopping malls established in 1982
1982 establishments in Thailand